Hernán Mendoza is a Mexican actor and theatre director best known in his native country for his roles in Mexican films, and telenovelas. in 2017 he won as Best Actor in a Minor Role for his role of Palafox in the film The 4th Company in the 59th Ariel Awards.

Early career 
Mendoza was born and raised in Mexico City, Mexico. He is the son of the late theater director Héctor Mendoza, and brother of the renowned director and composer Rodrigo Mendoza. He studied acting at the Centro de Educación Artística of Televisa. After that, he entered the Nucleus of Theater Studies evaluated by Julio Castillo and Luis Fernando de Tavira Noriega.

Filmography

Film roles

Television roles

References

External links 
 

Mexican male telenovela actors
People from Mexico City
20th-century Mexican male actors
21st-century Mexican male actors
Living people
Mexican male film actors
Mexican male stage actors
Mexican male television actors
People educated at Centro de Estudios y Formación Actoral
Year of birth missing (living people)